Ebrahim Ranjbarkivaj is an Iranian paralympic archer. He participated at the 2016 Summer Paralympics in the archery competition, being awarded the bronze medal in the men's individual recurve open event. He also competed in the mixed team recurve open event, being awarded the silver medal with his teammate Zahra Nemati. He had competed in archery events at the 2000 and 2012 Summer Paralympics, without winning a medal.

References

External links 
Paralympic Games profile

Living people
Place of birth missing (living people)
Year of birth missing (living people)
Iranian male archers
Archers at the 2000 Summer Paralympics
Archers at the 2012 Summer Paralympics
Archers at the 2016 Summer Paralympics
Paralympic medalists in archery
Paralympic archers of Iran
Paralympic bronze medalists for Iran
Paralympic silver medalists for Iran
21st-century Iranian people